Glacier Bluff is an ice cliff  high, forming the north side of the entrance to Yankee Harbour, Greenwich Island, in the South Shetland Islands, Antarctica.  It was charted and named in 1935 by Discovery Investigations personnel on the Discovery II.

References

Cliffs of Antarctica